Night Witches was the German nickname for an all-female Soviet World War II bomber regiment. It may also refer to:
 Night Witch, a comic series in the Rivers of London universe, which refers to the Soviet regiment
 "Night Witches", a 2014 song from Heroes (Sabaton album) about the Soviet regiment
 Night Doctors, also known as Night Witches, bogeymen in African-American folklore
 "The Night Witches", a 2017 story in the Doctor Who: The Early Adventures series
 Night Witches, a team in the Boulder County Bombers roller derby league